Daimler Co Ltd v Continental Tyre and Rubber Co (Great Britain) Ltd [1916] 2 AC 307 is a UK company law case, concerning the concept of "control" and enemy character of a company. It is usually discussed in the context of lifting the corporate veil, however it is merely an example of where the corporate veil is not in issue as a matter of company law, since the decision turns on correct interpretation of a statute.

Facts
All except one of Continental Tyre and Rubber Co Ltd's shares were held by German residents and all directors were German residents. The secretary was English. Continental Tyre and Rubber Co Ltd supplied tyres to Daimler, but Daimler was concerned that making payment might contravene a common law offence of trading with the enemy as well as a proclamation issued under s 3 (1) Trading with the Enemy Act 1914. Daimler brought the action to determine if payment could be made, given that it was the First World War.

Judgment
At first instance, Scrutton J approved the decision of the master, that the contracts were valid, for summary judgment without proceeding to trial.

Court of Appeal
Lord Reading CJ, Cozens-Hardy LJ, Phillimore LJ, Pickford LJ and Kennedy LJ, affirmed the decision too, holding there would be no offence. They held the company did not change its character because of the outbreak of war. The say it, "remains an English company regardless of the residence of its shareholders or directors either before or after the declaration of war." Mr Gore-Browne argued, for Daimler Co Ltd, that the technicality should be swept aside in time of war. But Lord Reading CJ replied that the fact of incorporation was not just a ‘technicality’. The company, he said,

He relied on Janson v Driefontein Consolidated Mines, where Lord Macnaghten, Lord Brampton and Lord Lindley, holding that a foreign corporation does not become British because its means all are.

Buckley LJ delivered a dissenting judgment, would have held that though the company is a legal person existing apart from its corporators, that it still had enemy character.

House of Lords
The House of Lords unanimously reversed the decisions below, saying the secretary was authorised to commence no action. It held the company was capable of acquiring enemy character.

Lord Parker said, 

Just like a natural person can have enemy character though born in the UK, so can a legal person.

The Earl of Halsbury LC, Lord Atkinson, Viscount Mersey, Lord Kinnear and Lord Sumner concurred. Lord Shaw and Lord Parmoor concurred in the result but dissented on this point.

Significance
Around the start of World War II the Trading with the Enemy Act 1939 section 2(1)(c) was implemented to state the position in Daimler, namely "so long as the body is controlled by a person who, under this section, is an enemy". In Bermuda Cablevision Ltd v Colica Trust Co Ltd Lord Steyn made the point that, "Expressions such as ‘control’ and ‘controlling interest’ take their colour from the context in which they appear. There is no general rule as to what the word ‘controlled’ means.... The expression must be given the meaning which the context requires."

The concept of a company's character was also seen in the ill-fated Merchant Shipping Act 1988 said that only fishing vessels registered as ‘British’ were eligible to fish for the UK quota, and a ‘British’ company had to be 75% British owned. However, in R (Factortame) v Secretary of State for Transport (No 3), the European Court of Justice held that this was contrary to art 52 TEC, and the right to freedom of establishment.

See also
UK company law

Notes

 This case law has also been mentioned in the "Companies Act, 1956" of India.

References

United Kingdom company case law
House of Lords cases
1916 in case law
1916 in British law
United Kingdom in World War I
Economic warfare
Daimler Company